Frame analysis (also called framing analysis) is a multi-disciplinary social science research method used to analyze how people understand situations and activities. Frame analysis looks at images, stereotypes, metaphors, actors, messages, and more. It examines how important these factors are and how and why they are chosen. The concept is generally attributed to the work of Erving Goffman and his 1974 book Frame analysis: An essay on the organization of experience and has been developed in social movement theory, policy studies and elsewhere.

Framing theory and frame analysis is a broad theoretical approach that has been used in communication studies, news (Johnson-Cartee, 1995), politics, and social movements among other applications. "Framing is the process by which a communication source, such as a news organization, defines and constructs a political issue or public controversy" (Nelson, Oxley, & Clawson, 1997, p. 221). It is related to the concept of agenda-setting. Framing influences how people interpret or process information. This can set an agenda. However, frame analysis goes beyond agenda-setting by examining the issues rather than the topics.

Frame analysis is usually done in regard to news media. However, framing is inevitable, as everyone does it. It can speed up the process of interpretation as well as writing and presenting the news. People just may not realize they are using frames. When people are aware that they are using framing, there are several techniques that can be used. These may include: metaphor, stories, tradition, slogan, jargon, catchphrase, artifact, contrast or spin.

As rhetorical criticism
Frame analysis had been proposed as a type of rhetorical analysis for political actors in the 1980s.  Political communication researcher Jim A. Kuypers first published his work advancing framing analysis as a rhetorical perspective in 1997. His approach begins inductively by looking for themes that persist across time in a text (for Kuypers, primarily news narratives on an issue or event), and then determining how those themes are framed. Kuypers' work begins with the assumption that frames are powerful rhetorical entities that "induce us to filter our perceptions of the world in particular ways, essentially making some aspects of our multi-dimensional reality more noticeable than other aspects. They operate by making some information more salient than other information. ..." In "Framing Analysis From a Rhetorical Perspective" Kuypers details the differences between framing analysis as rhetorical criticism and as a social scientific endeavor, in particular arguing that framing criticism offers insights unavailable to social scientists.

In his 2009 work, Rhetorical Criticism: Perspectives in Action Kuypers offers a detailed template for doing framing analysis from a rhetorical perspective. According to Kuypers, "Framing is a process whereby communicators, consciously or unconsciously, act to construct a point of view that encourages the facts of a given situation to be interpreted by others in a particular manner. Frames operate in four key ways: they define problems, diagnose causes, make moral judgments, and suggest remedies. Frames are often found within a narrative account of an issue or event, and are generally the central organizing idea." Kuypers' work is based on the premise that framing is a rhetorical process and as such it is best examined from a rhetorical point of view.

Distinctions within primary frameworks 
In his book, Goffman said that people use their primary framework to examine their world. There are also distinctions within primary frameworks. There are natural and social frameworks. Natural frameworks don't apply social forces to situations. They just exist naturally. However, social frameworks do apply social forces to situations. The two are connected because social frameworks stem from natural frameworks.

For social movements
Framing has been utilized to explain the process of social movements (Snow & Benford, 1988). Movements are carriers of beliefs and ideologies. In addition, they are part of the process of constructing meaning for participants and opposers (Snow & Benford, 1988). Mass movements are said to be successful when the frames projected align with the frames of participants to produce resonance between the two parties. This is a process known as frame alignment.

Frame alignment—a process to explain social movement theory
Snow and Benford (1988) say that frame alignment is an important element in social mobilization or movement. They argue that when individual frames become linked in congruency and complementariness, that "frame alignment" occurs (p. 198; Snow et al. 1986, p. 464), producing "frame resonance", which is key to the process of a group transitioning from one frame to another (although not all framing efforts are successful). The conditions that affect or constrain framing efforts are:
 "The robustness, completeness, and thoroughness of the framing effort". Snow, Rochford, Worden and Benford (1986) identify three core framing tasks and the degree to which these tasks are attended to will determine participant mobilization. The three tasks are: 
 diagnostic framing for the identification of a problem and assignment of blame;
 prognostic framing to suggest solutions, strategies, and tactics to a problem; and
 motivational framing that serves as a call to arms or rationale for action.
 The relationship between the proposed frame and the larger belief system; centrality – the frame cannot be of low hierarchical significance and salience within the larger belief system. Its range and interrelatedness – if the frame is linked to only one core belief or value that, in itself, is of limited range within the larger belief system, the frame has a high degree of being discounted.
 Relevance of the frame to the realities of the participants; a frame must be relevant to participants and inform them. Relevancy can be constrained by empirical credibility or testability, it relates to participant experience, and has narrative fidelity, that is, it fits in with existing cultural myths and narrations.
 Cycles of protest (Tarrow 1983a; 1983b); the point at which the frame emerges on the timeline of the current era and existing preoccupations with social change. Framing efforts may be affected by previous frames.

Snow and Benford (1986) propose that once proper frames are constructed as described above, large-scale changes in society such as those necessary for social movement can be achieved through frame alignment.

For political thought
Frame analysis for political thought has been dominated by two popular cognitive scientists: George Lakoff, nurturant parent governance; and Frank Luntz, strict father governance.

Content analysis in framing 
The deductive frame analysis pre-defines frames and then looks for them in the news to see which stories fit into the definitions. The inductive frame analysis requires that a story is analyzed first. The researcher looks for possible frames that have been loosely defined.

Common frames in the news 

 Conflict: conflicts between individual people, groups, institutions, etc.
 Economic consequences: looks at the economic consequences of a situation in the news and how it may affect people, groups, institutions, etc. economically
 Human interest: adds emotion or a human side to an issue, event, etc.
 Morality: applies religious or moral beliefs to a situation
 Responsibility: makes someone (individual, group, institution, etc.) responsible for a situation

Other examples of frames may include: health severity, thematic and episodic, medical, uncertainty, alarmist. What frames are used depends on the event at hand.

Four types of frame alignment
There are four types, which include frame bridging, frame amplification, frame extension and frame transformation.

 Frame bridging is the "linkage of two or more ideologically congruent but structurally unconnected frames regarding a particular issue or problem" (Snow et al., 1986, p. 467). It involves the linkage of a movement to "unmobilized sentiment pools or public opinion preference clusters" (p. 467) of people who share similar views or grievances but who lack an organizational base.
Frame amplification refers to "the clarification and invigoration of an interpretive frame that bears on a particular issue, problem, or set of events" (Snow et al., 1986, p. 469). This interpretive frame usually involves the invigorating of values or beliefs.
 Frame extensions are a movement's effort to incorporate participants by extending the boundaries of the proposed frame to include or encompass the views, interests, or sentiments of targeted groups. (Snow et al., 1986, p. 469)
Frame transformation is a process required when the proposed frames "may not resonate with, and on occasion may even appear antithetical to, conventional lifestyles or rituals and extant interpretive frames" (Snow et al., 1986, p. 473). When this happens, new values, new meanings and understandings are required in order to secure participants and support. Goffman (1974, p. 43–44) calls this "keying" where "activities, events, and biographies that are already meaningful from the standpoint of some primary framework transpose in terms of another framework" (Snow et al., 1986, p. 474) such that they are seen differently. There are two types of frame transformation:
 Domain-specific transformations such as the attempt to alter the status of groups of people, and
 Global interpretive frame transformation where the scope of change is quite radical as in a change of world views, total conversions of thought, or uprooting of all that is familiar (e.g. moving from communism to market capitalism; religious conversion, etc.).

Automated frame analysis
Since frame analyses are conducted manually, they require significant effort and time. Recently, some researchers have proposed to automate parts of frame analysis. For example, one approach aims to find instances of biased news coverage in news articles.  The automated approach imitates frame analysis by using natural language processing and media bias models.

See also

References

External links
Rockridge Institute articles on frame analysis, archived by Cognitive Policy Works whom provides commercial frame analysis.
Frameworks Institute provides frame analysis, based on scholarly research, for non-profits.

Communication studies
Social science methodology
Erving Goffman
framing (social sciences)